Leily Is with Me is a 1996 Iranian comedy war film directed by Kamal Tabrizi. The film was also televised as a mini-series with five episodes. It was the first Iranian film to use humor in the war context. Many critics regard the film as the best Iranian war comedy.

Plot
The film depicts the story of a cameraman named Sadegh (played by Parviz Parastui) during the Iran–Iraq War. Sadegh works for television and he has a lot of economic problems. He is in great need for a loan to solve his problems. A friends suggests him to have short visit to the war zone to prepare a report from there. This would make him a good record in terms of patriotic and ideological commitment and would gain him the loan he needs. Sadegh is scared of the war zone but for the sake of the loan he decides to go. He accompanies Mr. Kamali, another television employee but higher than him in ranking, who seems to him a loyal believer in the cause of the war. Sadegh's short plan for visiting war areas far from the front line turns into nightmare getting him closer every hour to the front line and death. While he tries to escape the situation, he still needs to prove himself to Kamali and avoid showing himself as a coward. The audience gradually finds out that Kamali is as coward as Sadegh and he wishes to leave the war zone too. It's only the audience that knows Sadegh and Kamali both have misconceptions about each other. As Sadegh designs plans to gradually get away from the front line, incidents make him closer and closer to face-to-face confrontation with the enemy. That's why Kamali thinks of him as a crazy suicidal warrior and tries to get rid of him. Meanwhile Sadegh's view towards Iranian fighters starts to change from crazy men willing to die to ordinary men loving to safeguard their country and believes. Sadegh is finally trapped in the front line and gets besieged by an army of tanks while the only living man near him is a wounded RPG shooter. He guides Sadegh how to shoot and Sadegh has to face all his fears confronting with the tanks. Sadegh shoots the tank and the same time seems to get killed by the tank's shooting. In the next scene Sadegh's family and friends go to find his dead body in the hospital. But they find out he is only wounded but not dead. To their surprise Sadegh is not the man he used to be as he expresses his willingness to go to the war zone again.

The name Leily has its roots in Persian poetry and the tale of Layla and Majnun. Leily is a symbol of the beloved and the title of the film refers to Sadegh finding the ultimate beloved in his journey.

Cast 
 Parviz Parastui – Sadeq Meshkini
 Mahmud Azizi – Kamali
 Shohreh Lorestani – Elaheh
 Sahereh Matin - Sadeq's Aunt

References

External links 

1996 films
1990s war comedy films
1990s Persian-language films
Iran–Iraq War films
Iranian war comedy films
1996 comedy films
Films whose writer won the Best Screenplay Crystal Simorgh
Films directed by Kamal Tabrizi